The paper money of the Hungarian korona was part of the circulating currency in the post-World War I Kingdom of Hungary until the introduction of the pengő in 1927. The variety of the banknotes and treasury notes and the variety of issuing authorities reflect the chaotic postwar situation in the country.

Austro-Hungarian Bank notes (1919)
The Austro-Hungarian Bank, the central bank of Austria-Hungary, had the exclusive patent to print banknotes throughout the Austro-Hungarian Empire. Banknotes were printed in Vienna, Hungary was supplied from there. During the First World War, the chief secretary of the Vienna headquarters intentionally suspended the delivery of banknotes to Hungary.

After the World War, the Hungarian Károlyi government requested the Austro-Hungarian Bank to deliver printing plates and banknote paper to Hungary, since it would have been too dangerous to deliver printed banknotes due to the political uncertainty. The banknotes (1, 2, 25 and 200 crowns) printed in Budapest under the Károlyi government and then under the Hungarian Soviet Republic were distinguished with a different serial number (1 K: higher than 7000; 2 K: higher than 7000; 25 K: higher than 3000; 200 K: higher than 2000). After the fall of the Soviet Republic, Vienna declared these banknotes to be counterfeits.

Postal Savings Bank notes (1919)
The Postal Savings Bank notes (Postatakarékpénztári jegy) were issued under the decree of the Revolutionary Governing Council of the Hungarian Soviet Republic by the Magyar Postatakarékpénztár (Hungarian Postal Savings Bank), which was acting as the emission bank of Hungary then. The prewar high denomination banknotes of the Austro-Hungarian Bank were deposited at par to prevent inflation.

Overstamped Austro-Hungarian Bank notes (1920)
Hungary was the last country among the successor states of the Monarchy to execute overstamping of the common money. The Károlyi government planned to start it on 21 March 1919, but the establishment of the Soviet Republic postponed these plans. Finally, the banknotes (the denominations from 10 to 10,000 crowns) were overstamped from 18 March 1920. Hungary used a red, round stamp to mark the banknotes.

State notes (1920-1926)
State notes were first issued in 1921. The designer was Ferenc Helbing. The banknotes were first printed in Switzerland by Orell Füssli, Zürich (except for the lower denominations, which were not worth counterfeiting) then in Hungary by the newly founded Banknote Printing Co. (Magyar Pénzjegynyomda Rt.) in Budapest. The banknote size was increasing with the higher denominations, which prompted the press to resize the banknotes: from 1923, smaller versions were printed with the same (or slightly different) design.

Main state note printing mark variations:

Low denomination bills (1 to 20 K, printed in 1920): no mark (printed in Budapest by different printers)
Large size bills (50 to 25,000 K, printed in 1920 and 1922): ORELL FÜSSLI  ZÜRICH
Small size bills (100 to 1,000,000 K, printed in 1923 and 1923): ORELL FÜSSLI  ZÜRICH or Magyar Pénzjegynyomda Rt. Budapest. or no mark (printed by the Magyar Pénzjegynyomda Rt. in Budapest)
All large and small size notes (50 to 1,000,000 K): T. W. or W or T. WILLI to show the name of the inventor of the photo guilloche technique used to print the state notes (Traugott Willi ??? he prepared line drawing for a Swiss franc banknote )

After 25 August 1926 the 1,000 to 1,000,000 korona banknotes were overstamped to show the value in pengő (at the rate of  korona to 1 pengő).

External links

  bankjegy.szabadsagharcos.org (Hungarian banknote catalog)
  www.numismatics.hu (Roman and Hungarian related numismatic site)
  papirpenz.hu (pictures of Hungarian banknotes)
  www.eremgyujtok.hu (homepage of the Hungarian Coin Collectors' Society)
 Pictures of Hungarian banknotes at Ron Wise’s World Paper Money Homepage,

Further reading
  
  (summary in ) 

Economic history of Hungary
Hungary